Scopula didymosema is a moth of the  family Geometridae. It is found in southern Australia.

References

Moths described in 1893
didymosema
Moths of Australia